Rickman is both a surname and a given name. As a surname, one origin is as the English version of the German surname Ryckman.

Notable people with the name include:

People with the surname Rickman:
Alan Rickman (1946–2016), English film, television and stage actor
John Rickman (parliamentary official) (1771–1840), English statistician and government official
John Rickman (psychoanalyst) (1891–1951), English psychoanalyst
Jolie Christine Rickman (1970–2005), American feminist, humanitarian, and social activist
Phil Rickman (21st century), British author
Thomas 'Clio' Rickman (1760–1834), English writer and bookseller
Thomas Rickman (1776–1841), English architect
Thomas Rickman (writer), American screenwriter (also goes as Tom Rickman)
William Rickman (1731–1783), political leader of the American Revolution

People with the given name Rickman:
Sir Rickman Godlee, 1st Baronet (1849–1925), English surgeon

Fictional characters with the surname Rickman:
Angus Rickman, fictional character in the television series Sliders
Dennis Rickman, fictional character in the soap opera EastEnders
Sharon Rickman, fictional character in the soap opera EastEnders

See also
3692 Rickman, main-belt asteroid
Rickman Motorcycles, defunct motor vehicle manufacturer of the United Kingdom

References